Sea Base, formerly known as Florida National High Adventure Sea Base, is a high adventure program base run by the Boy Scouts of America (BSA) in the Florida Keys. Its counterparts are the Philmont Scout Ranch in northern New Mexico, the Northern Tier National High Adventure Bases in Ely, Minnesota as well as Manitoba and Ontario in Canada, and The Summit Bechtel Family National Scout Reserve near the New River Gorge National Park in southern West Virginia.

The main Sea Base is located in Islamorada, Florida on the end of Lower Matecumbe Key. Other bases include the Brinton Environmental Center located on Summerland Key (which oversees Big Munson Island located 5.5 miles southeast) the Bahamas Sea Base in Marsh Harbour, Abaco, Bahamas, and the USVI Sea Base with locations in St. Thomas.

The Florida Sea Base Conference Center has become an alternative training site to the Philmont Training Center and the Summit Bechtel Reserve. Most conferences it hosts are for professionals or national level committees, but it also hosts conferences for outside groups.

Early history
In 1928, the Sea Base property was the site for the first ferry terminal in the original overseas highway. Cars would board the boat and travel to No Name Key, where the road would continue. The Terminal Lunch stand, later called the Ferry Slip Cafe opened around the same time. In the Early 1930s, the property was known as WPA camp number 3. WPA workers were building a new highway parallel to the Overseas Railroad. The 1935 Labor Day Hurricane changed everything. The entire camp was destroyed in the storm. Most of the workers who lived at the camp were World War I veterans. Many of the workers were being evacuated to Homestead when their rescue train was washed off the tracks on Upper Matecumbe Key. Over 450 people died in the Islamorada area during the hurricane. The evidence of the workers' progress is still evident today. Veterans Key, in front of Sea Base's marina, is a man-made island made for a highway right-of-way. 8 bridge pilings protrude out of the water about a quarter of a mile west of veterans Key, for a bridge that was to connect Lower Matecumbe Key and Jewfish Bush Key and was never built.

The new Overseas Highway completed in 1938, included a toll house on the current location of Sea Base's commissary. The toll was removed in 1954. The Ferry Slip Cafe became the Toll Gate Inn and it was owned by local shark fisherman, Wynn Tyler. The Toll Gate Inn was a 10-room motel, a bar, restaurant, marina, and gas station. The marina was dredged in the early 1950s, at the same time that most of the canals in Lower Matecumbe Key were dredged out.

New beginning
In 1974 a handful of volunteers from Miami, Florida and Atlanta, Georgia came together to develop a high adventure program using the waters in and around the Florida Keys as their foundation. The BSA National High Adventure chairman, John R Donnell Sr, asked the then Camping Director of the South Florida Council, Sam Wampler, to coordinate trips to Freeport in The Bahamas. Sam, using his station wagon and a warehouse, operated this program until 1979. The original Florida Gateway High Adventure committee members were Paul Benedum, John R Donnell Sr., Spurgeon Gaskin, Ernie Jamison, and chairman Charlie Topmiller. In 1977 over 700 participants were in the program, urging the Florida Gateway committee to look for a permanent location for a camp. Under Wampler's leadership, the National Council received a 1.3-million-dollar grant from the Fleischmann Foundation. The remaining $500,000 was used to construct the sailing dorms, the quarterdeck, general manager's residence, to repair to the T-dock, purchase a SCUBA compressor, and renovate the restaurant to a dining hall and office.

Florida Gateway High Adventure Base
The camp began small, but started growing immediately. The former Land Between the Lakes National High Adventure Base contributed a couple of canoes, a pontoon boat, some office equipment and one employee, Stu Cottrrell, who became the first program director. The Florida Gateway High Adventure Base opened on May 15, 1980. 800 Scouts attended the first summer. By 1982 construction and renovation was complete and the name was changed to the Florida National High Adventure Sea Base. In December 1982, the National Council of the Boy Scouts of America was given Big Munson Island from Homer Formby. It is now used for the Out Island Program, and as a part of the Key Adventure Program. In 1984 the new Scuba pools were dedicated, and in 1987, more land was purchased for future expansion.

Expansion
Since that original gift, there have been several other grants and purchases which have allowed the base to grow. In 1991, the hurricane proof Scuba dorms were completed. John W and Tommie M Thomas made a gift of $70,000 to Sea Base for new staff and conference housing, the Thomas Building that was dedicated on May 15, 1992. A new interfaith chapel was dedicated in 1993. In 1994 the galley was remodeled again, and was subsequently renamed the Donnell Center, after John Donnell, Sr. Also in 1994 the first Corinthian 45 dive boat, the BSA Tarpon joined the fleet. With generosity from Union Pacific CEO Drew Lewis, a new administration building, dedicated to William L Adams, opened May 3, 1995. After a donation by Frank Heckrodt in 1998, a second Corinthian 45, the BSA Scoutmaster was purchased. In 2001 a new maintenance shop was finished. Sea Base was not done growing; a new facility was in the works. As a result of a very generous $7 million donation from the Brinton Trust, The Brinton Environmental Center was dedicated on May 5, 2001, and officially opened its doors on June 1, 2001. The center is named after J. Porter Brinton, the project's benefactor. The Brinton Center is located at mile marker 23 and it became the base of operations for Scouts going to Big Munson Island. Sea Base was struck with tragedy, when on March 24, 2002 founder Sam Wampler died from a long illness.

Today
Many of the Toll Gate Inn's original buildings are still a part of Sea Base. The motel is now called the Annex and houses seasonal staff. The bar and restaurant is now the galley, and the gas station is now used as the commissary.

The Sea Base Fleet includes 16  Dusky drive boats, a  Dusky fishing boat, two 18 ft (6 m) flats skiffs, six  Newton Dive boats, two Corinthian  dive boats and many charter sailboats.

Sea Base celebrated its 30th anniversary, commemorating the day on February 8, 2010, the same day of the 100th anniversary of the Boy Scouts of America. In front of the Ship’s Store, a Lignum vitae tree was planted by local Troop 914, as a commemoration of the occasion with many local dignitaries in attendance.

Sea Base had its 40th anniversary in 2020, and a new dock was built and commemorated the work of Keith Douglass and his 30 years of work for the scouts. Sea Base Crew Photo Archive was set up and officially launched on January 27, 2021.

Programs
Sea Base offers the following week-long programs:
 Bahamas Adventure is a sailing trip operating from the Bahamas Sea Base.
 Bahamas Tall Ship is a sailing trip operating from the Bahamas Sea Base.
 Out Island Adventure is a trip where participants live on the "deserted island" of Big Munson Key. Participants travel 5.5 miles by Polynesian War Canoe to the island; activities include fishing, snorkeling and kayaking through a mangrove tree maze.
 Coral Reef Sailing is a sailing trip aboard a 40–50 ft. sailing boat with a minimum of 5 snorkeling dives. 
 STEM Eco Adventure
 Sea Exploring is a sailing trip aboard a large sailing vessel.
 Florida Keys Adventure operates out of the Brinton Environmental Center.
 Florida Fishing Adventure is a week-long fishing adventure, including deep-sea, reef, and back-country fishing, along with visiting Key West. Operated out of the Brinton Environmental Center.
 Marine STEM Adventure
 SCUBA Certification is a PADI scuba diving certification program.
 SCUBA Adventure is a SCUBA program for certified crews.
 SCUBA Live-Aboard is a SCUBA program for certified participants that combines the sailing and scuba diving programs.
 Sea Base St. Thomas

Other programs include:
 Divemaster Training Academy certifies participants as PADI Divemasters.
 Instructor Development Course certifies participants as PADI Instructors.
 OA Ocean Adventure

Environmental Impact 
Throughout the years Sea Base has recognized the impact humans have on the ocean and corals. This has begun a few programs that are built to improve the environment of Sea Base. During the adventures while at the Briton Environmental Center, scouts are given the ability to help tag dolphinfish and were taught the proper method to tag. Briton Environmental Center also houses a Coral Restoration program in which many different types of coral are grown and then planted by staff on the reefs. Sea Base has collaborated with Key Dives for conservation in a joint cleanup effort called "Turtle Truk" and helped removed 120 pounds of trash.

See also
 Scouting in Florida
 Florida Keys

References

National camps of the Boy Scouts of America
Florida Keys
1980 establishments in Florida